In the natural sciences, especially in atmospheric and Earth sciences involving applied statistics, an anomaly is a persisting deviation in a physical quantity from its expected value, e.g., the systematic difference between a measurement and a trend or a model prediction. 
Similarly, a standardized anomaly equals an anomaly divided by a standard deviation. 
A group of anomalies can be analyzed spatially, as a map, or temporally, as a time series.
It should not be confused for an isolated outlier.
There are examples in atmospheric sciences and in geophysics.

Calculation
The location and scale measures used in forming an anomaly time-series may either be constant or may themselves be a time series or a map. For example, if the original time series consisted of daily mean temperatures, the effect of seasonal cycles might be removed using a deseasonalization filter.

Robust statistics, resistant to the effects of outliers, are sometimes used as the basis of the transformation.

Examples

Atmospheric sciences
In the atmospheric sciences, the climatological annual cycle is often used as the expected value.  Famous atmospheric anomalies are for instance the Southern Oscillation index (SOI) and the North Atlantic oscillation index.  SOI is the atmospheric component of El Niño, while NAO plays an important role for European weather by modification of the exit of the Atlantic storm track.
A climate normal can also be used to derive a climate anomaly.

Geophysics
 Gravity anomaly, difference between the observed gravity and a value predicted from a model
 Bouguer anomaly, anomaly in gravimetry
 Free-air anomaly, gravity anomaly that has been computed for latitude and corrected for elevation of the station
 Iridium anomaly, an unusual abundance of what is normally a very rare element in the Earth's crust
 Magnetic anomaly, local variation in the Earth's magnetic field
 Bangui magnetic anomaly, in central Africa
 Kursk Magnetic Anomaly, territory rich in iron ores located within Kursk Oblast, Belgorod Oblast, and Oryol Oblast
 Temagami Magnetic Anomaly, large buried geologic structure in the Temagami region of Ontario, Canada

See also
Bias (statistics)
Climate oscillation
Frequency spectrum
Innovation (signal processing)
Least squares
Least-squares spectral analysis

References

Time series
Climate and weather statistics
Geophysics